England: The Album, released in 2004, is a compilation of music which all is closely related to the England national football team. The album was released to coincide with the Euro 2004 football tournament. The compilation was re-released in 2006 with minor changes to the track list, this new version is called England: The Album 2006

2004 album
This album was released 2004

Track listing
 Queen – "We Are the Champions"
 Baddiel, Skinner and The Lightning Seeds – "Three Lions '96"
 The Farm – "All Together Now"
 The Stranglers – "Peaches"
 Fat Les – "Vindaloo"
 5,6,7,8's – "Woo Hoo"
 Collapsed Lung – "Eat My Goal"
 England World Cup 1970 Football Team – "Back Home"
 UB40 featuring United Colours of Sound – "Swing Low, Sweet Chariot"
 Centrespot – "Great Escape '99"
 Chumbawamba – "Tubthumping"
 Oasis – "Cum on Feel the Noize"
 Grandad Roberts and Elvis – "Meat Pie, Sausage Roll (Come on England, Give Us a Goal)"
 Ant & Dec – "We're on the Ball"
 Nat 'King' Cole – "Papa Loves Mambo"
 Ron Goodwin and his Orchestra – "Dambusters March"
 Royal Air Force Central Band – "Land of Hope and Glory"
 Fat Les – "Jerusalem"
 José Carreras – "Nessun Dorma"
 Monty Python – "Always Look on the Bright Side of Life"

2006 album
The 2006 album is essentially an updated version of the 2004 album with new songs. The album cover is similar, adding the '2006' suffix in white with a red outline. The album was released in conjunction with talkSPORT, who in response recorded a single for the album, this being "We're England (Tom Hark)". This single was released under the artist name "The Talksport Allstars" and is the sixth track on the album.

Track listing
 Queen – "We Are the Champions
 Baddiel, Skinner & The Lightning Seeds – "Three Lions" (1998 version)
 Fat Les – "Vindaloo"
 4-4-2 – "Come on England"
 Sham 69 and the Special Assembly – "Hurry Up England – The People's Anthem"
 The Talksport Allstars – "We're England (Tom Hark)"
 Chumbawamba – "Tubthumping"
 DJ Ötzi – "Hey Baby (Footbal Version)"
 5678's – "Woo Hoo"
 Republica – "Ready to Go"
 The Farm – "All Together Now 2004"
 The Bees – "Chicken Payback"
From a Sure Deodreant advertisements
 Elvis vs JXL – "A Little Less Conversation"
From a Nike advertisement
 Perry Como – "Papa Loves Mambo"
From a Nike advertisement
 England World Cup Squad 1970 – "Back Home"
 Centrespot – "Great Escape '99"
 Ant & Dec – "We're on the Ball"
 Koopa – "Stand Up 4 England"
 Young Stanely – "Sing It for England"
 Ron Goodwin & His Orchestra – "The Dambusters March"
 The Central Band of The Royal Air Force – "Land of Hope and Glory"
 Fat Les – "Jerusalem"
 José Carreras – "Nessun Dorma"
 Carl Davis featuring The BBC Concert Orchestra and BBC Singers – "Sports Prepare"
 Monty Python – "Always Look on the Bright Side of Life"

"We're England (Tom Hark)" single track listing
 Main mix – 3:03
 Karaoke mix – 3:03
 Instrumental mix – 3:03

2010 album
For the 2010 FIFA World Cup, a third version of the album was released. A single for the album was released called "'The Squad' Presents... Three L10ns" (Three L10ns meaning Three Lions 2010). This version features Russell Brand, Robbie Williams, Ian Broudie, Trevor Horn (who produced the song) and David Baddiel, who make 'The Squad'. It could be noted Frank Skinner did not return for the song, who was previously featured on "Three Lions" 1996 and 1998.

Single track listing
CD version
2010 version – 4:17
1996 version – 3:36
Asda CD version
2010 version – 4:17
Asda Choir version – 4:16

References

2004 compilation albums
EMI Records compilation albums